Rémy (born Rémy Camus in Le Blanc-Mesnil, Seine-Saint-Denis on 13 January 1997), is a French rapper from Aubervilliers, Seine-Saint-Denis.

History 
Rémy was born on January 13, 1997, to an assembly line worker father and a mother caretaker of a building in the Pont-blanc neighborhood in Aubervilliers, Seine-Saint-Denis where he grew up. He wrote his first rap songs at the age of 10–11. While a first-year professional baccalaureate student at the Lycée Suger in Saint-Denis, Seine-Saint-Denis, Rémy decided to end his studies to devote himself to a career in hip-hop. He was spotted by emblematic Aubervilliers rapper Mac Tyer, who gave him a solo track on his studio album "Banger 3". The success of his first single "Je vois" earned him to be signed on the label Def Jam France. On July 28, 2017, Rémy released his second single entitled "On traîne". In October 2017, Rémy, invited by Hornet La Frappe, made a much remarked performance when he interpreted the unreleased song "Réminem", on the instrumental of Eminem's "Mockingbird", in live from the "Planète Rap" show on the radio station Skyrock.

Rémy unveiled the singles : "Je te raconte", "Comme à l'Ancienne" featuring Mac Tyer, "Rappelle-toi" and "Un peu ivre", before releasing his first studio album "C'est Rémy" on March 23, 2018. "C'est Rémy" sold 10,191 albums during its first week. During an interview with the Swiss daily newspaper 20 minutes, Rémy reported that the album sold more than 40,000 copies between March and October 2018. The album was finally certified gold on August 5, 2019.

On October 25, 2019, Rémy released his second studio album "Rémy d'Auber".

Discography

Studio albums

References

1997 births
Living people
French rappers
Rappers from Seine-Saint-Denis
People from Aubervilliers